Beverley Louise Bolin (23 January 1923 – 19 September 2014) was the first woman to become a registered architect in South Australia. She graduated with a Bachelor of Engineering (Architectural) from the University of South Australia in 1949.

Early life and education
Beverley Louise Bolin was born in Sydney on 23 January 1923. Ernest William Bolin and Mabel Kathleen Bolin were British immigrants and they soon moved to Brighton in South Australia. They settled in Tranmere in Emerson Grove.

Beverley completed the combined Engineering Degree in Architecture at the Adelaide University and Fellowship Diploma of Architecture at the South Australian School of Mines and Industries (now University of South Australia). She was the first woman to become a registered architect in South Australia. While at university, Beverley was active in the Adelaide University Women’s Union as well as Wilderness School Old Scholars for her former school (McDonough 2012). She also participated into University life through club involvement being including the Adelaide University Engineering Society. Whilst she was studying she was apprenticed to Adelaide architects and she then went on to work for the South Australian Housing Trust.

Career
In 1950 Balin was working in London where she became an Associate of the Royal Institute of British Architects.

In 1988 she was working near Los Angeles where she was the President of the Women’s Architectural League. Despite this in 1998 Bolin was identified as a "Missing Golden Jubilee Graduate".

Personal life and death
Bolin married Robert D. Carter in London in 1956, with whom she had one son, Christopher.

Bolin later moved to Suffolk. She died in Southwold, Suffolk on 19 September 2014, at the age of 91.

Professional affiliations
 South Australian Institute of Architects (Student Member), 1947 
 South Australian Institute of Architect (Associate Member), 1948
 Royal Institute of British Architects (Associate Member), 1950 - 1960 
 Registered with Architects Registration Council of the United Kingdom, 1955
 President - Women's Architectural League, USA 1988

Career
 Lawson and Cheeseman, 1946
 South Australian Housing Trust, 1947
 John Grey and Partner - London, 1948 - 1960
 John Grey and Partner - London, 1965 -

References

1923 births
2014 deaths
20th-century Australian architects
20th-century Australian women
Architects from Sydney
Associates of the Royal Institute of British Architects
Australian women architects